Karawata prasinata is a species of flowering plant in the family Bromeliaceae, native to Brazil (the state of Espírito Santo). It was first described in 2015 as Aechmea prasinata.

References

Bromelioideae
Flora of Brazil
Plants described in 2015